Helvetic may refer to:

Helvetii, Celtic tribes inhabiting this region during the Roman Empire
Helvetic Republic, the precursor of the state of Switzerland
Helvetic (geology), a geologic zone in the Alps
Helvetic Airways, a Swiss airline

See also
Helvetia (disambiguation)
Helvetica (disambiguation)
Helvete (disambiguation)